Bargeleh (also Romanized as Bar Galleh) is a village in Rostaq Rural District, in the Central District of Khomeyn County, Markazi Province, Iran. At the 2006 census, its population was 38, in 7 families.

References 

Populated places in Khomeyn County